Meethapur is a census town in the South East Delhi district of Delhi.

There is a famous crossway in Mithapur which is commonly known as Mithapur Chowk which serves Kalindi Kunj Road, Tanki Road-Jaitpur which connects Badarpur to Ekta Vihar Colony, Jaitpur road and Badarpur in Delhi. There is Asia's biggest ecological park near Mithapur which is known as NTPC Eco Park.

Demographics
 India census, Mithapur had a population of 41,243. Males constitute 56% of the population and females 44%. Mithapur has an average literacy rate of 67%, higher than the national average of 59.5%: male literacy is 75%, and female literacy is 56%. In Mithapur, 19% of the population is under 6 years of age. Mithapur is dominated by Awana clan of gurjar

References

Cities and towns in South Delhi district